A list of horror films released in 2009.

References

Lists of horror films by year
2009-related lists